Khan of Heaven or Tian Kehan, Celestial Kha(ga)n, Heavenly Kha(ga)n, Tengri Kha(ga)n (Old Turkic: 𐱅𐰭𐰼𐰃𐰴𐰍𐰣‬) was a title addressed to the Emperor Taizong of Tang by various Turkic nomads. It was first mentioned in accounts on May 20, 630 and again on October 24, 646, shortly after the Eastern Turkic Khaganate and Xueyantuo were annihilated by the Tang dynasty.

The title Tengri Khagan also used to refer other Turkic rulers, both known as the Tengri Khagan ( or ) or Täŋridä qaγan to the Chinese, during the Second Eastern Turkic Khaganate (r. 739–741) and Uyghur Khaganate (r. 759–779) periods.

It is uncertain whether the title also applied to the rest of the Tang emperors, or to the Wu Zhou empress regnant Wu Zetian, since the term "Khagan" only referred to male rulers and Empress Wu had started her dominion in the Chinese court after the year AD 665 until the year AD 705, which is after the title's first use by a Chinese emperor. However, two appeal letters from the Turkic hybrid rulers, Ashina Qutluγ Ton Tardu in 727, the Yabgu of Tokharistan, and Yina Tudun Qule in 741, the king of Tashkent, addressed the Emperor Xuanzong of Tang as Tian Kehan during the Umayyad expansion.

A later letter sent by the Tang court to the Yenisei Kirghiz Qaghan explained that "the peoples of the northwest" had requested Emperor Taizong of Tang to become the "Heavenly Qaghan".

See also 

 Chinese Tributary System
 Pax Sinica
 Emperor of China
 Emperor Taizong of Tang
 Khan
 Khagan (Great Khan)
 Sinocentrism
 Tang dynasty 
 Tian (Heaven) / Shangdi (God)
 Tian Xia (All under Heaven)
 Tian Chao (Dynasty of Heaven)
 Tian Ming (Mandate of Heaven)
 Tian Zi (Son of Heaven)
 Tengri

References

Citations

Sources 

 Bai, Shouyi et al. (2003). A History of Chinese Muslim (Vol. 2). Beijing: Zhonghua Book Company. .
 Liu, Yitang (1997). Studies of Chinese Western Regions. Taipei: Cheng Chung Book Company. .
 Xue, Zongzheng (1992). A History of Turks. Beijing: Chinese Social Sciences Press. .

Chinese royal titles
Chinese-language titles
+
History of Central Asia
Emperor Taizong of Tang